The Golden Blaze is a 2005 American animated superhero film written by Archie Gips and directed by Bryon E. Carson. The feature, starring the voices of Blair Underwood and Michael Clarke Duncan, had a limited theatrical run making it the second flash animation ever to be theatrically released, after Mexico's Magos y Gigantes in 2003, and the first in the United States. The film is animated and stylized like a comic book. It also took top honors at the prestigious 2005 Giffoni International Film Festival.

The film had a limited theatrical release on April 29, 2005, and released to DVD on May 10, 2005.

Plot

The bond between son Jason Fletcher and father Gregory Fletcher, known throughout their town as "The Fletcher Flops", strengthens after an accident with one of Gregory's inventions grants him the superpowers of Jason's comic book hero, The Golden Blaze. They then fight the richest man in the town; who, by the same accident; turned into the villain from Jason's comic book. The golden blazes catchphrase was "let the light of justice show the way"

Cast
 Blair Underwood as Gregory Fletcher/Golden Blaze
 Khleo Thomas as Jason Fletcher/Sure Shot
 Michael Clarke Duncan as Thomas Tatum/Quake
 Ricky D'Shon Collins as Leon
 Neil Patrick Harris as Comic Shop Owner
 Sanaa Lathan as Monica

References

External links

 Interview with Blair Underwood about the film

2005 films
2005 animated films
2000s American animated films
2005 fantasy films
African-American animated films
American children's animated science fantasy films
American children's animated superhero films
American animated feature films
American flash animated films
2000s animated superhero films
2000s English-language films